Chaikin, a surname of Yiddish origin, may refer to:

People 
 Andrew Chaikin, an American author and science journalist, known for writing A Man on the Moon
 Andrew Chaikin, known by the stage name Kid Beyond, an American singer
Azriel Chaikin, Chief Rabbi of the Chabad movement in Ukraine
 Carly Chaikin, an American actress
Carol Chaikin, an American jazz musician
 Joseph Chaikin, an American theater director and playwright
Linda Chaikin, an American historical fiction author
 Marc Chaikin, an American finance analyst, founder of Chaikin Analytics
Matt Chaikin, an American former drummer for Kommunity FK and Jane's Addiction
Paul Chaikin, an American physicist and New York University professor
 Sol Chick Chaikin, an American trade union organizer
Valentin Chaikin, a Russian speed skater

See also 
Chaiken